The Men's doubles event at the 2014 Commonwealth Games was held at the Scotstoun Sports Campus, Glasgow from 29 July to 3 August.

Cameron Pilley and David Palmer of Australia defeated Nick Matthew and Adrian Grant of England 10–11, 11–7, 11–9 to win the gold medal.

Medalists

Seeds

Finals

Group stage

Pool A

Pool B

Pool C

Pool D

Pool E

Pool F

Pool G

Pool H

References

Squash at the 2014 Commonwealth Games